Carlo Gatti (1817–1878) was a Swiss entrepreneur in the Victorian era. He came to England in 1847, where he established restaurants and an ice importing business. He is credited with first making ice cream available to the general public and he then moved into the music hall business. He returned to Switzerland in 1871, leaving his businesses in the hands of members of his family and he died a millionaire.

Gatti originated in Canton Ticino, the main Italian-speaking area of Switzerland. He was probably born in Marogno, a village within the then commune of Dongio, where he also ended his days. He was the youngest of a family of six, and his parents were Stefano and Apollonia.

Success in London 

Carlo had moved to London by 1847 at the latest, and lived in the Italian community in Holborn. At first, he ran a stall selling waffles and chestnuts. In 1849, he began to run a café and restaurant with partners. They specialised in selling chocolate and ice cream. They put a chocolate-making machine in the window to attract business, and took ice for the ice cream from Regent's Canal under a contract with the Regent's Canal Company. Their shop was the first to sell ice cream to the public; previously, ice cream was an expensive treat confined to rich people with access to an ice house.

Gatti exhibited his chocolate-making machine, imported from France, at the Great Exhibition in 1851. Also in 1851, Gatti opened a stand in Hungerford Market, near Charing Cross, to sell confectionery and cakes, hot coffee, cold soft drinks and ice cream. , A portion of ice cream was sold for one penny served in a shell, perhaps the origin of the penny lick.

Gatti built a large ice warehouse, capable of storing tons of ice in two large ice wells, in the Battlebridge Basin off the Regent's Canal, near King's Cross. He began importing ice from Norway from around 1860, shipping the ice from Norway, up the Thames, then transferring it to canal barges at the Regent's Canal Dock (today the Limehouse Basin) and via the canal to his ice warehouse. Starting with a single ice well in 1857, he built a second ice well around 1862, and became the largest ice importer in London. Today the ice warehouse houses the London Canal Museum. He began to run a fleet of delivery carts, supplying ice for domestic iceboxes.

Hungerford Market was damaged when the adjoining Hungerford Hall burned down in 1854, but Gatti was insured, and used the proceeds to build a music hall, known as Gatti's, which opened in 1857. He sold the music hall to South Eastern Railway in 1862, and the site became Charing Cross railway station.

With the proceeds from selling his first music hall, Gatti acquired a restaurant in Westminster Bridge Road, opposite the Canterbury Music Hall. He converted the restaurant into a second Gatti's music hall, known as "Gatti's-in-the-Road", in 1865. It later became a cinema. The building was badly damaged in the Second World War, and was demolished in 1950.

In 1867, he acquired a public house in Villiers Street named "The Arches", under the arches of the elevated railway line leading to Charing Cross station. He opened it as another music hall, known as "Gatti's-in-The-Arches".

Members of his family were involved in his businesses, and he spent most of his time in Switzerland after 1871.

Family 
In 1839 Carlo was married to Maria Marioni, by his eldest brother Giacomo, the priest at Castro.  In 1871 he married a second wife (Marietta Andreazzi, allegedly aged 23).

Death 
He died on the 8th September 1878.He is buried in Bellinzona (Switzerland), not far from his home valley.

According to food writer Elizabeth David, 'the ice business that he had set up endured and continued to expand for almost a century'.

His family continued to operate the music hall, known for a period after Gatti's death as the Hungerford or Gatti's Hungerford Palace of Varieties.  It became a cinema in 1910, and the Players' Theatre in 1946.

See also 
 Agnes Marshall, contemporary English ice-cream entrepreneur

References

External links 
 Gatti's music halls
 London Canal Museum
 Photos of Gatti's Tomb on Pinterest
 Bill posters from Gatti's Music Hall, from the British Library

Ice cream
People from Ticino
Swiss expatriates in England
1817 births
1878 deaths
Swiss emigrants to the United Kingdom
19th-century British businesspeople